The Religious Society of Friends, commonly known as Quakers, encouraged some values which may have been conducive to encouraging scientific talents.  A theory suggested by David Hackett Fischer in his book Albion's Seed indicated early Quakers in the US preferred "practical study" to the more traditional studies of Greek or Latin popular with the elite. Another theory suggests their avoidance of dogma or clergy gave them a greater flexibility in response to science.

Despite those arguments a major factor is agreed to be that the Quakers were initially discouraged or forbidden to go to the major law or humanities schools in Britain due to the Test Act. They also at times faced similar discriminations in the United States, as many of the colonial universities had a Puritan or Anglican orientation. This led them to attend "Godless" institutions or forced them to rely on hands-on scientific experimentation rather than academia.

Because of these issues it has been stated that Quakers are better represented in science than most religions. Some sources, including Pendlehill  and Encyclopædia Britannica, indicate that for over two centuries they were overrepresented in the Royal Society. Mention is made of this possibility in studies referenced in religiosity and intelligence and in a book by Arthur Raistrick. Regardless of whether this is still accurate, there have been several noteworthy members of this denomination in science. The following names a few.

Some Quakers in science
William Allen – more known for abolitionism and penal reform; a Fellow of the Royal Society and the Linnean Society of London
James Backhouse – botanist and missionary; author abbreviation "Backh"
Wilson Baker – organic chemist
John Bartram – described as the "father of American botany"; founded Bartram Botanical Gardens in Kingsessing on the bank of the Schuylkill River 
Anna McClean Bidder – marine zoologist and first president of Lucy Cavendish College, Cambridge
Kenneth E. Boulding – systems theorist and economist 
Russell Brain, 1st Baron Brain – neurologist known for Brain's reflex; became a Quaker in 1931 and gave the Swarthmore Lecture in 1944, "Man, Society and Religion", in which he stressed the importance of a social conscience
Jocelyn Bell Burnell – discovered the first radio pulsars with her thesis advisor Antony Hewish; raised Quaker in Northern Ireland; volunteered in local and national Quaker activities up to at least the 1970s; her Swarthmore Lecture was titled "Broken for Life"; still an active Quaker
John Cassin – ornithologist
Ezra Townsend Cresson – entomologist
Peter Collinson – botanist with some interest in electricity; his family belonged to the Gracechurch meeting of the Religious Society of Friends
Edward Drinker Cope – early paleontologist who took part in the Bone Wars and for whom Cope's Rule is named
John Dalton – taught at a Quaker school, but is best known for work in atomic theory.
Jeremiah Dixon – surveyor and astronomer known for the Mason–Dixon line
Henry Doubleday – horticulturist and lace designer 
Arthur Stanley Eddington – astrophysicist known especially for the Eddington experiment and as a populariser of science, active in the Quaker Guild of Teachers, attended meetings regularly; his Swarthmore Lecture was titled "Science and the Unseen World" 
George Ellis – co-authored The Large Scale Structure of Space-Time with University of Cambridge physicist Stephen Hawking; won the 2004 Templeton Prize and got involved with the Quaker Service Fund
John Fothergill – physician and botanist; Fothergilla (witch alder) is named for him
Robert Were Fox the Younger – geologist active in the early days of the British Association for the Advancement of Science
Ursula Franklin – metallurgist and physicist 
George Graham – clockmaker and geophysicist who discovered the diurnal variation of the terrestrial magnetic field
John Gummere – astronomer
Richard Harlan – naturalist
Thomas Hodgkin – lived in the more ultra-orthodox era of Quakerism so wore plain clothes and spoke in a formal manner; Hodgkin's disease is named for him
Rush D. Holt, Jr. – Congressman; former Assistant Director of the Princeton Plasma Physics Laboratory; beat Watson; has a patent for a "method for maintaining a correct density gradient in a non-convecting solar pond"
Luke Howard – meteorologist known for work in cloud types and nomenclature
George Barker Jeffery – known for Jeffery's equations and translating works on the theory of relativity to English; his Swarthmore Lecture was "Christ, Yesterday and Today"
Isaac Lea – conchologist born a Quaker
Graceanna Lewis – ornithologist and social reformer
Joseph Jackson Lister – known for his role in the development of the optical microscope; his son, Joseph Lister, 1st Baron Lister, was a pioneer in surgical sterile techniques, but left the Quakers and joined the Scottish Episcopal Church
Kathleen Lonsdale – prominent crystallographer; discovered the planar hexagonal structure of benzene; became a Quaker in 1935, as such, she was a committed pacifist and served time in Holloway prison during World War II because she refused to register for civil defense duties or to pay the resulting fine; her Swarthmore Lecture was titled "Removing the Causes of War"
Maria Mitchell – astronomer who was raised as a Quaker but later adopted Christian Unitarianism
Frank Morley – mathematician specializing in algebra and geometry and known for Morley's trisector theorem. Was the son of two Quakers
Frederick Parker-Rhodes – plant pathologist and linguistics researcher, also active in other fields 
William Philips – founder of the Geological Society of London
Lewis Fry Richardson – meteorologist; his Quaker beliefs exempted him from military service during World War I
Lucy Say – naturalist, nature artist, and first female member of the Academy of Natural Sciences of Philadelphia
Thomas Say – entomologist, conchologist, and herpetologist
Joseph Hooton Taylor, Jr. – astrophysicist and winner of the 1993 Nobel Prize in Physics for his discovery with Russell Alan Hulse of a "new type of pulsar, a discovery that has opened up new possibilities for the study of gravitation"
Silvanus P. Thompson – known for his book Calculus Made Easy; developed an idea of a telegraph submarine cable; his Swarthmore Lecture was titled "The Quest for Truth"
William Homan Thorpe – President of the British Ornithologists' Union from 1955-1960; his Swarthmore Lecture was titled "Quakers and Humanists"
Daniel Hack Tuke – expert on mental illness; came from a long line of Quakers from York who were interested in mental illness and concerned with those afflicted
Caspar Wistar – anatomist in colonial America
Thomas Young – polymath and child prodigy; raised Quaker.

See also
 List of Friends schools
 List of Quakers
 Relationship between religion and science
 Christianity and science

References

Further reading
Quakers in Science and Industry by Arthur Raistrick. 
 

Science
Quakers
Christianity and science
Quakerism-related lists